The Darussalam-class offshore patrol vessel is a class of four offshore patrol vessels constructed for the Royal Brunei Navy. They are the largest and most capable ships of the Royal Brunei Navy, and often participate in international naval exercises.

Development

Nakhoda Ragam contract dispute 
Three s were built by BAE Systems Marine (now BAE Systems Maritime – Naval Ships) for the Royal Brunei Navy. The contract was awarded to GEC-Marconi in 1995 and the ships, a variant of the F2000 design, were launched in January 2001, June 2001 and June 2002 at the then BAE Systems Marine yard at Scotstoun, Glasgow. Brunei refused to accept the three Nakhoda Ragam-class corvettes from BAE Systems. The contract dispute became subject to arbitration and was settled in BAE System's favour. The vessels were handed over to Royal Brunei Technical Services in June 2007. In 2007, Brunei contracted the German Lürssen shipyard to find a new customer for the three ships and the ships were eventually purchased by Indonesia.

OPV program 
Brunei ordered the Darussalam-class OPVs from Lürssen, the same company that Brunei contracted to sell the Nakhoda Ragam-class corvettes. The first batch of two vessels were delivered in January 2011, while the second batch of two vessels were delivered by 2014.

Ships of class

Gallery

See also
 List of naval ship classes in service
 List of Royal Brunei Navy ships

References

Royal Brunei Navy
Ships built in Germany
Patrol boat classes